Saltfjellet–Svartisen National Park is a national park in Nordland county in Norway. It is located within the municipalities of Beiarn, Meløy, Rana, Rødøy, Saltdal, and Bodø.  European route E6 and the Nordland Line both follow the southern and eastern borders around the park. The park's eastern border is the Norway-Sweden border and a portion of this border is shared with the Vindelfjällen Nature Reserve which lies in Sweden.

At , it is one of the largest national parks in Norway.  It is also one of the most varied, since it includes both alpine mountain formations with glacier tongues, as well as gently sloping mountain plateaus and forested valleys. The national park encompasses parts of the Saltfjellet mountain range.  The Svartisen glacier is a central part of the park.  There are also many Sami cultural landmarks within the park.

References

National parks of Norway
Protected areas of Nordland
Protected areas of the Arctic
Protected areas established in 1989
Tourist attractions in Nordland
1989 establishments in Norway